The 2018 Bromley London Borough Council election took place on 3 May 2018 to elect members of Bromley London Borough Council in England. This was the same day as other local elections.

Bromley was one of the boroughs subject to a trial of voter ID restrictions requiring the production of photographic ID or 2 other forms of ID.

Council results

Ward results

Bickley

Biggin Hill

Bromley Common and Keston

Bromley Town

Chelsfield and Pratts Bottom

Chislehurst

Clock House

Copers Cope

Cray Valley East

Cray Valley West

Crystal Palace

Darwin

Farnborough and Crofton

Hayes and Coney Hall

Kelsey and Eden Park

Mottingham and Chislehurst North

Orpington

Penge and Cator

Petts Wood and Knoll

Plaistow and Sundridge

Shortlands

West Wickham

2018-2022 by-elections

The by-election was called following the resignation of Dave Wibberley.

References

2018
2018 London Borough council elections